Vargachgeh-ye Zeyyed Ali (also Romanized as Vargachgeh-ye Zeyyed ʿAlī; also known as Vargachlekeh) is a village in Jalalvand Rural District, Firuzabad District, Kermanshah County, Kermanshah Province, Iran. At the 2006 census, its population was 21, in 5 families.

References 

Populated places in Kermanshah County